Società Sportiva Lazio Women 2015 a r.l. is an Italian women's football team representing professional male football club S.S. Lazio S.p.A.'s female's section. They currently play in Serie A Femminile.

History

Founded in 1969 as Olimpic Lazio, in 1975, the team became a section of  multi-sport club.

The second half of the 1980s was also successful, with two further championships and cups, including a double in 1987.

However, after changing their name from S.S. Lazio Calcio Femminile to S.S. Ruco Line Lazio Calcio Femminile in 1999, they rose back to win their fifth national championship in the  season (plus two additional Cups). 

At the end of the season, they were renamed as S.S. Enterprise Lazio Calcio Femminile but this lasted just one season before switching to A.D. Decimum Lazio Femminile in 2003.

In 2006, the team was renamed from A.D. Decimum Lazio Femminile to S.S. Lazio Calcio Femminile.

In September 2015, S.S. Lazio Women 2015 a r.l. was incorporated as a società a responsabilità limitata. This new women's team was a wholly owned subsidiary of the professional male football club S.S. Lazio S.p.A. which originated from but was not owned by  multi-sport club. They took S.S. Lazio Calcio Femminile's spot in Serie B (who were the original S.S. Lazio women's team). 

They finished seventh in their first (2015-16) and second (2016-17) seasons in Group D of Serie B. In 2017-18 they finished second, just 7 points away from first place Roma Calcio Femminile. In 2018-19, the format of Italian football for women was changed. 12 teams composed the league and Lazio Women finished in eighth. 

In 2019-20, the season was suspended due to COVID-19. Despite having more points than third place San Marino Academy, because of the formula that was used to calculate each club's final position, they were promoted to Serie A instead of Lazio Women.

In 2020-21, Lazio Women dominated the league and finished in first place to secure promotion to Serie A for the first time. Ashraf Seleman was in charge from rounds 1-14 but was replaced by Carolina Morace on December 31, 2021 and she led the squad for the remainder of the season.

In October 2021, Carolina Morace was dismissed and replaced by Massimiliano Catini.

Honours

Official
 5 Italian Leagues (1979, 1980, 1987, 1988, 2002)
 4 Italian Cups (1978, 1985, 1999, 2003)

Invitational
 1 Menton Tournament (1991)
 1 Italy Women's Cup (2003)

Players

Current squad

Non-playing staff 

 Team Managers: Monica Caprari / Andrea Pulcini / Daniele Morganti
 Head Coach: Massimiliano Catini
 Assistant Coach: Lorenzo Calabria
 Fitness Coach: Lorenzo Marcelli
 Goalkeeping Coach: Francisco Ruiz
 Team Doctors: Daniela Ceccarelli 
 Physiotherapists: Daniele Di Paolo / Saverio Venuti

Former players 
For details of current and former players, see :Category:S.S. Lazio Women 2015 players.

Former internationals

  Susanne Augustesen
  Carla Couto
  Kerry Davis
  Charmaine Hooper
  Anne O'Brien
  Thaís Picarte
  Beverly Ranger
  Conchi Sánchez
  Florentina Spânu
  Pia Sundhage

See also 
 S.S. Lazio
 S.S. Lazio Youth Sector
 S.S. Lazio Calcio a 5
 S.S. Lazio Calcio a 5 (Women)
 Serie A Femminile
 List of women's association football clubs
 List of women's football clubs in Italy

References

 Women
Football clubs in Rome

Women's football clubs in Italy
Association football clubs established in 1968
1968 establishments in Italy
Association football clubs established in 2015
2015 establishments in Italy
Serie A (women's football) clubs